The Muswell Hill Library is a grade II listed building in Queens Avenue, Muswell Hill, London.

References

External links
 

Grade II listed buildings in the London Borough of Haringey
Muswell Hill
Libraries in the London Borough of Haringey
Grade II listed library buildings